Ardara is a comune (municipality) in the Province of Sassari in the Italian region Sardinia, located about  north of Cagliari and about  southeast of Sassari.

It was one of the capitals of Giudicato di Torres. The village houses the ruins of the Castle of the Giudicato of Torres (11th century), the medieval walls, and the Romanesque Basilica of Santa Maria del Regno.

Ardara borders the municipalities of Chiaramonti, Mores, Ozieri, Ploaghe and Siligo.

Ardara is the birthplace of the singer Roberto Meloni, who represented Latvia at the 2007 and 2008 Eurovision Song Contest with Bonaparti.lv and Pirates of the Sea bands.

References

Cities and towns in Sardinia
Castles in Italy